Eduard Adrian Nicola (born 20 May 1983)  is a Romanian footballer who plays for Agricola Borcea.

External links
 
 
 

Living people
1983 births
People from Râmnicu Sărat
Romanian footballers
Association football defenders
Liga I players
CS Brănești players
FC Universitatea Cluj players
CSU Voința Sibiu players
ACS Poli Timișoara players
Liga II players
FC Gloria Buzău players
CS Inter Gaz București players
FC Rapid București players
LPS HD Clinceni players